The following is a timeline of the history of the city of Tucson, Arizona, U.S.

18th century
 1732 – Mission San Xavier del Bac founded by Jesuits near present-day Tucson.
 1776 – Presidio San Augustin del Tucson (military outpost) established.
 1779 – December 6: First Battle of Tucson.
 1782
 May 1: Second Battle of Tucson.
 December 25: Third Battle of Tucson (1782).
 1784 – March 21: Fourth Battle of Tucson, Sonora, New Spain.

19th century
 1846 – December 16: Capture of Tucson, Sonora, Mexico, by United States forces.
 1848 – Population: 760.
 1853 – Territory becomes part of the United States per Gadsden Purchase.
 1856 – August 29: Conference held to organize Arizona Territory.
 1857 – San Antonio-San Diego Mail Line in operation.
 1862
 February: Tucson occupied by Confederate forces.
 May 20: Capture of Tucson by Union forces.
 1863 – Tully, Ochoa & Co. merchandisers in business.
 1866 – L. Zechendorf & Co. merchandisers in business.
 1867 – Tucson becomes capital of Arizona Territory.
 1869 – St. Augustine Roman Catholic Church built.
 1870
 Arizona Citizen newspaper begins publication.
 J.S. Mansfield news depot in business.
 1872
 Public School department organized.
 Population: 3,500 (estimate).
 1873
 San Diego-Tucson telegraph begins operating (approximate date).
 Fort Lowell built near Tucson.
 1875 – Estevan Ochoa elected mayor.
 1876 – Pie Allen becomes mayor.
 1877 – Town incorporated.
 1878 – El Fronterizo newspaper begins publication.
 1879
 Arizona Daily Star newspaper begins publication.
 Presbyterian Church built.
 1880
 Southern Pacific Railroad begins operating.
 Tucson Library Association organized.
 St. Mary's Hospital opens near town.
 Population: 7,007.
 1881
 Atchison, Topeka and Santa Fe railroad begins operating.
 Methodist Church built.
 1882 – March 20: Wyatt Earp kills Frank Stilwell.
 1883 – City chartered.  Townsite is bounded by Speedway Boulevard on the north, 22nd Street on the south, 1st Avenue on the east, & on the west by Main Avenue from north of 18th Street, & 10th Avenue from south of 18th Street.
 1885 – The first public park in Tucson known as Carrillo's Gardens is built by Leopoldo Carrillo.
 1890 – Population: 5,150.
 1891 – University of Arizona opens per Morrill Act; Old Main, University of Arizona built.
 1893 – Arizona State Museum established.
 1897 – Roman Catholic Diocese of Tucson established;  Cathedral of Saint Augustine (Tucson) built.
 1900 – Population: 7,531.

20th century
 1903 – Desert Laboratory founded.
 1907 – Southern Pacific railway station built.
 1910 – Population: 13,193.
 1912 – City becomes part of new State of Arizona.
 1919
 City airfield established.
 Hotel Congress in business.
 1920 – Rialto Theatre (Arizona) opens.
 1927
 Charles Lindbergh visits city.
 Temple of Music & Art built.
 1928 – James A. Walsh United States Courthouse built.
 1929
 Pima County Courthouse and Consolidated National Bank building constructed.
 Pioneer Hotel in business.
 1930
 Fox Tucson Theatre and Plaza Theater (Tucson) open.
 Arizona Inn built.
 1933 – Henry Jaastad becomes mayor.
 1940
 Tucson Army Air Field established.
 South Tucson incorporates as a city.
 1941 – Davis–Monthan Air Force Base established.
 1950 – Catalina Highway constructed.
 1952 – Arizona-Sonora Desert Museum founded.
 1954 – Hirsh's Shoes (shop) built.
 1955
 Don Hummel becomes mayor.
 Southern Pacific 1673 train exhibit opens.
 1956 – Tucson Air National Guard Base active.
 1960
 University of Arizona Poetry Center founded.
 Old Tucson Studios theme park and El Con Mall in business.
 1962 – Phoenix Title Building constructed.
 1963 – Tucson International Airport begins operating.
 1964 – Tucson Botanical Gardens founded.
 1965 – DeGrazia Gallery built.
 1967
 University of Arizona College of Medicine and Reid Park Zoo founded.
 Jim Corbett (politician) becomes mayor.
 Tucson Federal Savings & Loan Association Building constructed.
 1969 – Pima Community College established.
 1971
 Tucson Opera Company and Food Conspiracy Co-op founded.
 Tucson Community Center built.
 1972 – Planetary Science Institute founded.
 1975 – Center for Creative Photography established.
 1976 – Tucson Community Food Bank and Pima Air & Space Museum established.
 1977 – Bank of America Plaza (Tucson) built.
 1978 – Arizona State Prison Complex – Tucson in operation.
 1982
 Federal Correctional Institution, Tucson in operation.
 Tucson Mall and Casas Adobes Foothills Mall (Arizona) in business.
 1984 – Channel 12 government access TV begins broadcasting (approximate date).
 1985 – Tucson Historic Preservation Foundation established.
 1986 – One South Church built.
 1987 – Thomas Volgy becomes mayor.
 1990 – Population: 405,390.
 1991
 Biosphere 2 built.
 George Miller (Arizona politician) becomes mayor.
 1996
 Goodricke-Pigott Observatory dedicated.
 Museum of Contemporary Art, Tucson founded.
 1998
 City website online (approximate date).
 Park Place (Tucson, Arizona) shopping mall in business.
 1999 – Bob Walkup becomes mayor.

21st century
 2001 – Anselmo Valencia Tori Amphitheater opens.
 2004
 La Encantada shopping center in business.
 October 5: Murder of Brian Stidham.
 2005
 Jewish History Museum (Tucson) established.
 Southern Arizona Transportation Museum dedicated.
 2007
 United States Penitentiary, Tucson in operation.
 2010
 Con-Nichiwa anime convention begins.
 Population: 520,116.
 2011
 January 8: Shooting of U.S. Representative Gabby Giffords and eighteen others in Casas Adobes.
 January 12: Barack Obama Tucson memorial speech.
 May 5: Jose Guerena shooting.
 November 8: Tucson mayoral election, 2011.
 December 5: Jonathan Rothschild becomes mayor.
 Casino Del Sol Hotel Tower and UniSource Energy Building constructed.
 2013 – Armed Citizens Project active.

See also
 History of Tucson, Arizona
 National Register of Historic Places listings in Pima County, Arizona
 List of television stations in Tucson
 List of tallest buildings in Tucson
 Timeline of Arizona
 Timelines of other cities in Arizona: Mesa, Phoenix

References

Bibliography

Published in 19th century
 
 
 
 
 
 

Published in 20th century

External links

 Arizona State University Libraries. Items related to Tucson in the Hayden Arizona Collection
 Arizona Archives Online. Materials related to Tucson, various dates
 Library of Congress, Prints & Photos Division. Materials related to Tucson, various dates
 Digital Public Library of America. Items related to Tucson, various dates

 
Tucson
Tucson
Years in Arizona